Ramón Tapia Zapata (March 17, 1932 in Antofagasta – April 12, 1984) was a Chilean boxer who won the silver medal at the 1956 Summer Olympics in Melbourne, Australia. Tapia died in 1984.

Olympic results 
Defeated Zbigniew Piórkowski (Poland) K.O.
Defeated Július Torma (Czechoslovakia) K.O.
Defeated Gilbert Chapron (France) points
Lost to Gennadi Shatkov (Soviet Union) K.O.

References

1932 births
1984 deaths
Olympic boxers of Chile
Boxers at the 1956 Summer Olympics
Olympic silver medalists for Chile
People from Antofagasta
Olympic medalists in boxing
Chilean male boxers
Medalists at the 1956 Summer Olympics
Middleweight boxers
20th-century Chilean people